Hurricane Lili was the third of only four Atlantic tropical cyclones on record to reach hurricane status in the month of December with the others being an unnamed hurricane in 1887, December 1954's Alice, and 2005's Epsilon. The final of thirteen tropical storms in the 1984 Atlantic hurricane season, Lili developed as a subtropical cyclone which originated from a frontal trough to the south of Bermuda on December 12. It tracked southeastward, then northward, slowly attaining tropical characteristics and becoming a hurricane on December 20. Lili turned to the south and southwest, briefly threatening the northern Caribbean islands before weakening and dissipating near the coast of the Dominican Republic. The storm produced light rainfall but no damage.

Meteorological history

In the second week of December, a frontal trough stalled south of Bermuda. An upper level disturbance moved over the area on December 9, and produced widespread convection along the frontal wave.

On December 13, a ridge of high pressure to its north forced the storm southeastward, and the following day the storm turned to the south after an upper-level cold-core low developed over the system. After turning to the northwest on December 17, the high pressure system again halted its northward movement, leaving the storm drifting south-southeastward. Conditions favored further strengthening, and the subtropical storm reached  winds on December 18.

Higher pressures developed to its northeast, resulting in the hurricane to accelerate to the southwest. On December 22, Lili finished executing its large cyclonic loop by passing over the same location it passed one week prior. The combination of its increased forward speed, as well as increased levels of vertical wind shear, created an unfavorable environment which caused steady weakening. It rapidly lost organization as it approached the Leeward Islands, and dissipated just off the coast of the Dominican Republic on December 24.

Impact and records
When Lili reached hurricane status on December 20, it became one of only four Atlantic tropical cyclones to reach hurricane strength in the month of December. The other three were an unnamed hurricane in 1887, Alice in 1954 Atlantic hurricane season, and Epsilon in 2005. In addition, Nicole lasted as a hurricane from late November to early December 1998.

Because of its rapid movement, a hurricane watch was issued for Puerto Rico and the Virgin Islands on December 22. As the storm weakened, the watches were discontinued. In response to the threat of the hurricane, officials posted a small craft advisory along the coastline of northern Puerto Rico. There, the weakening tropical cyclone produced light rainfall, though there was no reported damage. Lili moved through Hispaniola as an area of squally weather, but damage, if any, is unknown.

Accounts 
Sailor Brian Hancock encountered Hurricane Lili during the Route of Discovery yacht race from Benalmádena, Spain to Santo Domingo in the Dominican Republic.Tropical Storm Lili was traveling at around 18 knots along the same path as the race fleet and was starting to pick off the slower boats. Astern of us we were getting reports of gale force winds, ripped sails and some damage all the while Lili gained in strength. By our calculation we would get to the Bahamas before the storm did, but the problem was that the Bahamas were not our final destination. We had to round San Salvador and then sail just under 500 miles back toward the east, well southeast to be exact. We rounded San Salvador and sailed slap bang into the teeth of a ferocious storm. Hurricane Lili was packing around 70 to 80 knots of wind and we have to ride it out. I remember feeling exhilarated by it all. It helps to be a little naive and dumb but that’s how you are when you are in your 20’s.

See also

 Other storms of the same name
 List of off-season Atlantic hurricanes
 List of Category 1 Atlantic hurricanes

References

External links
 NHC Lili Report
 1984 Monthly Weather Review

Lili
Lili (1984)
Lili (1984)
1984 meteorology
Lili